The Jim Henson Hour is a television series that aired on NBC in 1989. It was developed as a showcase for The Jim Henson Company's various puppet creations, including the Muppet characters.

Nine of the twelve episodes produced aired on NBC before the program was canceled due to low ratings. Two episodes later aired on Nickelodeon in 1992 and 1993, and the final episode "Food" never aired. The show was never broadcast in the UK. After The Jim Henson Hour, the Muppets did not have another prime-time TV show until Muppets Tonight in 1996, six years after Jim Henson's death.

Format
The Jim Henson Hour was modeled after the Walt Disney Presents specials, in which every week Disney would show off the latest innovations and creations of his production company. At the beginning of each episode, Jim Henson would enter an abstractly-decorated set (alongside the Thought Lion from his series The StoryTeller) and introduce the evening's show. Beyond that, the series never had a set structure. The room where Henson and the Thought Lion performed their introduction was computer-generated environment.

Three of the twelve installments were hour-long mini-movies:

 The faux film noir "Dog City", narrated by Muppet Rowlf the Dog
 "Monster Maker", in which an alienated teenager begins secretly working at a special-effects company
 "Living with Dinosaurs", in which a young boy's stuffed Dinosaur comes to life and helps him deal with a troubled family life.

Other shows like "Secrets of the Muppets" went behind the scenes at Henson studios, showing how the Muppets are built and operated.

Ordinarily, however, the hour was split into two thirty-minute segments. These shows would always start with a modernized variation of The Muppet Show, titled MuppeTelevision. That would often lead into more serious and sometimes darker content, such as a rerun of The StoryTeller. Occasionally, a light-hearted story or more Muppet situations would close out the hour in the second half.

The first episode produced —Sesame Street… 20 Years & Still Counting— was aired as a stand-alone special. Henson's series officially premiered a week later.

MuppeTelevision
MuppeTelevision regularly occupied the first half of The Jim Henson Hour. It was an updated version of the classic series The Muppet Show, the new twist being that the Muppets were now running an entire cable television network rather than a single variety show. The Muppets broadcast their network's programming from a unique control room called "Muppet Central". Regulars included previous characters Kermit the Frog, Gonzo and Link Hogthrob in addition to new characters Digit, Leon the Lizard, Lindbergh the Kiwi, Vicki, Clifford, Jacques Roach, and a computer-generated Muppet named Waldo C. Graphic. Also appearing as a series regular was Bean Bunny, who had previously starred in the television special The Tale of the Bunny Picnic (1986). After The Jim Henson Hour ended, Waldo would go on to have a main role in the theme park film Muppet*Vision 3D (1991), and Clifford and Bean Bunny would continue to make appearances in various Muppet productions.

Muppet performer Frank Oz's characters Fozzie Bear and Miss Piggy appeared intermittently, due to scheduling conflicts with Oz's directing career. Miss Piggy received her own thirty-minute special in one show, called Miss Piggy's Hollywood, in which she and Gonzo tried to interview unwilling celebrities.

The house band for MuppeTelevision was called Solid Foam, taking the place of the Electric Mayhem band that had appeared in most previous Muppet projects. The band members included, Digit on keyboard, Flash on saxophone and vocals, Clifford on bass guitar and vocals, Beard on guitar and vocals and an unnamed female drummer.

Electric Mayhem regulars Zoot and Animal eventually made appearances with Solid Foam in the episode "Food." Dr. Teeth also appeared in the background of a few of Solid Foam's music videos.

MuppeTelevision would get interrupted on some occasions by an illegal TV station called Gorilla Television run by Ubu the Gorilla, Chip, and Zondra.

As with The Muppet Show, every episode had a celebrity guest star.  Louie Anderson, Ted Danson, Smokey Robinson, Buster Poindexter, and k.d. lang were among those who got a chance to appear in the show's run.

Episodes

Cast
 Jim Henson – Himself
 John Hurt – Storyteller
 Erica Lancaster – Amanda
 Jennifer Lee – Bootsie
 Andrew Wilson – Brad

Muppet performers

 Jim Henson – Kermit the Frog, Dr. Teeth, Rowlf the Dog, Link Hogthrob, Waldorf, Muppet Newsman, Swedish Chef, Waldo C. Graphic (demonstration only), Whatnot (demonstration only), Timecaster, Timrek the Gorf, Doglion, Bugsy Them
 Camille Bonora – Fern, Jojo, Miss Belle, Blanche, Ruth, Twitch Bunny
 Rickey Boyd – Laughing Boy, Aart the Armadillo
 Fran Brill – Vicki, Zondra, Merlin's Assistant, Alfonso D'Bruzzo, Maxine, Colleen
 Kevin Clash – Clifford, Leon the Lizard, Codzilla, Doglion, Timmy Monster (voice), Zoot, Ace Yu, Blue Extreme, Green-Furred Frackle, Nick the Anaconda
 Dave Goelz – Gonzo, Digit, Cabbage, Doglion, Timmy Monster, Dr. Bunsen Honeydew, Frisky, Jade Green Frackle, Milton
 Brian Henson – Storyteller's Dog, Dog the Dinosaur
 Richard Hunt – Beaker, Statler, Lugsy Bunny
 Brian Knatchbull
 Trish Leeper
 Rob Mills – Sweetums, Gramps, Solid Foam Drummer, Ubu the Gorilla (2nd Time), Animal
 Jerry Nelson – Lobster, Narrator, Jo Beth Garfdoohoo, Sheep, Shark, Fish, Beard, Wolf, Bubba the Bartender, Luncheon Counter Monster, Cow, a guy with a sword through his head, Garbage, Raccoon, Slim, Orange Extreme, Ralph the Robin
 Frank Oz – Miss Piggy, Fozzie Bear
 Mike Quinn - Devil
 Dan Redican – Beautiful Day Monster, Rhonda, Anthony
 Gord Robertson – Lindbergh the Kiwi, Chip, Luncheon Counter Monster, Timmy Monster, Rat, Scruffy, Vinnie Molar
 Bob Stutt – Ubu the Gorilla (1st time)
 Karen Valleau
 Steve Whitmire – Waldo C. Graphic, Bean Bunny, Foo-Foo, Yellow Extreme, Jacques Roach, Flash, Garbage, Billy the Bear, Doozer, Mad Dog, Wilf the Howler Monkey
 Sharon Lee Williams – Purple Extreme (voice only)

Special guest stars
 Louie Anderson – Himself
 Chris Langham as Marty the Earthling/Officer/Additional Muppet Performer/Exerciser
 Elliott Spiers as Prince Leo
 Nicholas Selby as "The Heartless Giant" King
 Gemma Jones as Queen
 Ted Danson – Himself
 Chris Makepeace as Zeb Norman
 Helen Burns as Clara Buford
 John Dunsworth as Sam
 Willard Scott – Himself
 The Nylons – Themselves
 Jane Pauley – Herself
 Bob Peck as Soldier
 John Franklyn-Robbins as Tzar
 Tony Jackson, Peter Marinker, and Peter Hawkins as Devils (voice)
 Bobby McFerrin – Himself
 Dudley Moore – Himself
 Justine Bateman – Herself
 Karl Rumberg – Himself
 Kathleen Wirt – Herself
 Marc Weiner – Himself
 George Wendt – Himself
 Bob Hope – Himself
 Harry Dean Stanton – Chancey Bellows
 Michael Gambon – Ultragorgon (voice)
 Kieran O'Brien as Matt Banting
 Alison Steadman as Perriwinkle
 George Costigan as Father
 Smokey Robinson – Himself
 Sean Bean as Prince
 Jane Horrocks as Anja
 Alun Armstrong as Troll (voice)
 Michael Kilgarriff as Thought Lion (voice)
 Sandra Voe as Trollop (voice)
 K.d. lang – Herself
 Alison Doody as Sapsorrow
 Dawn French as Bad Sister 1
 Jennifer Saunders as Bad Sister 2
 Geoffrey Bayldon as "Sapsorrow" King
 Gregory Chisholm as Dom Marshall
 Juliet Stevenson as Vicky Marshall
 Michael Maloney as Lee Marshall
 David Johansen – Himself
 Joely Richardson as Princess
 Miranda Richardson as Witch
 Jonathan Pryce as "The Three Ravens" King

Cancellation and "lost" episodes
The show frequently acknowledged its own low ratings, with segments offering satirical takes on what viewers would rather watch—violent movies, ridiculous stunts, etc. In the end, the show produced twelve episodes, three of which did not make it to air before cancellation.

In 1992, children's cable network Nickelodeon aired Secrets of the Muppets, one of the lost episodes. They followed with the previously unaired Living with Dinosaurs segment, as a standalone special in 1993. The Jim Henson and Muppets segments in that episode have never aired. The final hour, consisting of the MuppeTelevision installment "Food" and The StoryTeller episode "The Three Ravens", has never aired, though "The Three Ravens" segment has aired in the UK as part of the Storyteller series.

In Canada, the MuppeTelevision segments have run as a separate series called The Jim Henson Show. All of the feature drama segments, except for "Miss Piggy's Hollywood", have been run as standalone specials in the US and other countries, and have been released on home video. The StoryTeller segments have run with that series.

Unused episode ideas
In addition to the abandoned hour-long episodes of The StoryTeller, Lead-Free TV and picture-book specials, Jim Henson had many ideas for potential episodes or features that were never produced. These ideas included: The Saga of Fraggle Rock (a Fraggle Rock origin story), Inside John (a variation on Henson's Limbo concept in which the various parts of a seventeen-year-old boy's brain try to wrest control of him throughout a typical day) and ASTRO G.N.E.W.T.S. (a special that would have blended puppets with animation, computer graphics, and video effects). Other stories were proposed by Henson involving enchanted bowling balls, extraterrestrial mailmen, outer-space adventures, and a detective story with Kermit and the other Muppets. Henson also considered adapting Madeleine L'Engle's A Wrinkle in Time and the works of A. A. Milne. Also proposed was "an hour-long musical special featuring The Electric Mayhem in Mexico".

Ownership
Following the sale of The Muppets and Bear in the Big Blue House to The Walt Disney Company in 2004, the rights to various portions of the show have been split between Disney and The Jim Henson Company. The Walt Disney Company owns all of the MuppeTelevision segments (including the 15-minute episode shown with Dog City), Miss Piggy's Hollywood, and The Secrets of the Muppets, while The Jim Henson Company retains ownership of the rest of the series.

Credits
 The Jim Henson Hour
 The Muppet Performers: Jim Henson, Jerry Nelson, Dave Goelz, Steve Whitmire, Kevin Clash, Fran Brill

References

External links

 

1989 American television series debuts
1989 American television series endings
1980s American children's comedy television series
1980s American anthology television series
The Muppets television series
American television shows featuring puppetry
Television series by The Jim Henson Company
NBC original programming
English-language television shows